The Massachusetts Center for the Book is  Massachusetts's affiliate of the Center for the Book in the Library of Congress.

Mission
The Massachusetts Center's mission is to "advance the cause of books and reading and enhance the outreach potential of Massachusetts libraries".

Massachusetts Book Award
The Massachusetts Center recognizes important contemporary work by authors or about Massachusetts subjects with its annual Massachusetts Book Award.

Recipients of the award from 2000 to 2010 have included Eric Carle, Louise Glück, Alice Hoffman, Stanley Kunitz, Dennis Lehane, Moying Li, Lois Lowry, Megan Marshall, Roland Merullo, Nathaniel Philbrick, Jayne Anne Phillips and John Pipkin.

See also
 Books in the United States

References

External links
Official site
Center for the Book in the Library of Congress

Center for the Book
Centers for the Book